Carcraft may refer to:

 Carcraft, a defunct group of used car hypermarkets
 Carcraft, a virtual world where Waymo can simulate driving conditions